Laughter is a Canadian drama film, directed by Martin Laroche and released in 2020. The film stars Léane Labrèche-Dor as Valérie, a woman who was the sole survivor of a massacre in her hometown several years earlier in the midst of a civil war; although she has successfully rebuilt her life with a job in a long-term care home and a new romantic relationship with Gabriel (Alexandre Landry), she still struggles with survivor's guilt until the arrival of Jeanne (Micheline Lanctôt), a new patient at the home, gives her a new perspective on life.

The film's cast also includes Sylvie Drapeau, Christine Beaulieu, Catherine Proulx-Lemay, Jean-Sébastien Courchesne, Évelyne Rompré and Évelyne de la Chenelière.

The film premiered in theatres on January 31, 2020. On April 7, with virtually all film distribution in Canada suspended due to the COVID-19 pandemic in Canada, the film was made available for free internet streaming as a special one-day promotion by its distributor, Maison 4:3.

Critical response
For Le Devoir, Jérôme Delgado praised Labrèche-Dor's performance, but wrote that the film overall was riddled with plot holes, most notably the fact that the film's physical and social setting showed virtually no traces of actually having been torn apart by war. André Duchesne offered a similar assessment for La Presse, criticizing the lack of any significant information in the film about an event that would have been far more traumatic to society than was evident in the screenplay. He also noted that a key scene in the film, a soliloquy by the long-term care centre's human resources director, was so similar to a scene in Denys Arcand's 2003 film The Barbarian Invasions (Les Invasions barbares) that he hoped, but did not know for sure, that the scene was intended as a deliberate homage.

Accolades

The film received two Prix Iris nominations at the 22nd Quebec Cinema Awards:

References

External links
 
 

2020 films
2020 drama films
Canadian drama films
2020s French-language films
Films set in Quebec
Films shot in Quebec
Films directed by Martin Laroche
French-language Canadian films
2020s Canadian films